The Ponnier D.III was a French monoplane racing aircraft, designed to compete in the 1913 Gordon Bennett Trophy race.  It finished a close second.

Development
During 1911 René Hanriot hired Alfred Pagny, previously at Nieuport, as a designer. After Hanriot military prototypes failed to win orders at the Concours Militaire in late 1911 he sold his aircraft interests to another of his designers, Louis .  Pagny designed two similar single seat monoplanes for Hanriot and Ponnier, the Hanriot D.I and the Ponnier D.III; the latter was sometimes referred to as the Hanriot D.III. His designs reflected Nieuport practice, particularly with the replacement of Hanriot's graceful boat-like shell fuselages with flat sided, deep chested ones.

The Ponnier D.III was a single seat, mid wing monoplane designed to compete in the 1913 Gordon Bennett Trophy race. Pairs of landing wires on each side met over the fuselage at a pyramidal four strut pylon and parallel flying wires went to the lower fuselage. An oil deflecting cowling, open at the bottom, surrounded the powerful double row, fourteen cylinder Gnome Lambda-Lambda rotary engine, which delivered  to a 2 m diameter propeller. The oval, open cockpit was placed at mid-wing, just aft of the pylon centre. It had a finless rudder at the extreme rear of the fuselage and a straight edged tailplane mounted on the upper fuselage ahead of it. The elevators were aerodynamically separate but interconnected, controlled by central wires. The D.III had a fixed, conventional undercarriage with mainwheels on a single axle mounted to the fuselage by pairs of wire cross-braced V-struts, plus a simple elliptical leaf spring tailskid.

Jane's All the World's Aircraft 1913 describes a longer Hanriot D.III with a  Gnome engine; this motor does not appear in other cited contemporary accounts.

Operational history
The D.III participated in the Gordon-Bennett Trophy race held at Rheims and piloted by Emile Védrines. After an hour's flight the Ponnier finished second, just 66 seconds behind Maurice Prévost in a Deperdussin Monocoque; both aircraft used the same double row engine.

Specifications (160 hp Gnome)

References

1910s French sport aircraft
Mid-wing aircraft
Single-engined tractor aircraft
Hanriot aircraft
Aircraft first flown in 1913
Rotary-engined aircraft